Slade Hopkinson (1934 – 1993) was a Guyana-born poet, playwright, actor and teacher.

Early life
Slade Hopkinson was born into a middle-class family in New Amsterdam, Guyana. His father was a barrister-at-law, and his mother a nurse. A few years after the death of his father, his mother took Slade and his sister to live in Barbados where he attended Harrison College. In 1952, he went to the University College of the West Indies on a scholarship, coinciding with Derek Walcott and Mervyn Morris as students. Slade Hopkinson was active in university theatre. He directed Oedipus and King Lear. He obtained his BA in 1953 and a Dip. Ed. in 1956.

Career
He worked in Jamaica as a teacher, weekly newspaper editor, and a government information officer. He married (Freda) and had two children, Nalo (a novelist) and Keita (a painter and the founder of TorontoJazzBuzz). In 1962 the family went to live in Trinidad and Slade Hopkinson joined Derek Walcott's Trinidad Theatre Workshop and was a celebrated Corporal Lestrade in Dream on Monkey Mountain. He studied at the Yale Drama School on a Rockefeller scholarship between 1965 and 1966, taught at the University of Guyana (1966–68), then returned to the TTW. However, by 1970 there was a falling out with Walcott and he founded the Caribbean Theatre Guild in 1970.

His writing career began in 1954 with the publication of The Four and Other Poems; the plays, The Blood of a Family (1957), Fall of a Chief (1965), The Onliest Fisherman (1967), and Spawning of Eel (1968), rewritten as Sala and The Long Vacation. In 1976 the Government of Guyana published two companion collections of poetry, The Madwoman of Papine, which contained mainly his secular poems ranging over his Caribbean experiences, and The Friend, which contained his religious and philosophical poems, written in the process of discovering the teachings of the Sufis.

Hopkinson was also active in the "Anira" literary group, which operated out of the home of Martin Carter's mother and included Carter, Sydney Singh, Jan Carew, Milton Vishnu Williams and others.

In addition, Hopkinson wrote a couple of short stories, and his poetry was widely published in journals such as Bim, Savacou, New World and in anthologies such as Anansesem, The Penguin Book of Caribbean Verse and Voiceprint. Snowscape With Signature, a selection of the poems written between 1952 and 1992, was published by Peepal Tree Press in 1993, with an introductory memoir by Mervyn Morris.

Later life
Slade Hopkinson became a Muslim in 1964, changing his name to Abdhur Rahman Slade Hopkinson. By 1970 he was suffering from kidney failure and by 1973 was on regular dialysis, bringing to an end his acting career. He worked for the Jamaican Tourist Board for some years before moving to Canada as Vice-Consul for Guyana. Later he worked as a classroom assistant and teacher before taking long-term disability leave.

Abdhur-Rahman Slade Hopkinson, by then suffering a cancer of the kidneys, died just before the publication in 1993 of the Snowscape With Signature collection.

Selected works
 The onliest fisherman: a medium-length play in 1-act. Kingston Extra-Mural Department of the University College of the West Indies, 1950.
 The four: and other poems. [Barbados]: [Advocate Co.], 1954.
 The madwoman of Papine: poems. Georgetown, Guyana: Ministry of Education and Social Development, 1976.
 'Electric Eel Song'. In Stewart Brown, Mervyn Morris and Gordon Rohlehr, eds., Voiceprint: an anthology of oral and related poetry from the Caribbean, Harlow: Longman Caribbean, 1989.
 'Marcus Aurelius and the Transatlantic Baakoo'. In Mervyn Morris, ed., The Faber Book of Contemporary Short Stories, London; Boston: Faber and Faber, 1990.
 Snowscape With Signature: Poems, 1952-1992. Leeds, England: Peepal Tree, 1993.

External links
 A Critical Appreciation of Abdur-Rahman Slade Hopkinson’s Marcus Aurelius and the Transatlantic Baakoo
 Critical review of Snowscape With Signature

References

Guyanese poets
Guyanese dramatists and playwrights
Guyanese short story writers
Guyanese Muslims
Converts to Islam
Deaths from kidney cancer
1934 births
1993 deaths
Yale School of Drama alumni
20th-century poets
People from New Amsterdam, Guyana